James McLachlan may refer to:
James McLachlan (American politician) (1852–1940), U.S. Representative from California
James McLachlan (Australian politician) (1871–1956), Australian Senator from South Australia
James McLachlan Sr., member of the South Australian House of Assembly
James McLachlan (Victorian politician) (1862–1938), Australian politician
James McLachlan (scholar), American scholar and theologian
J. B. McLachlan (1869–1937), Canadian politician and labour leader
James Douglas McLachlan (1869–1937), British wartime military attaché to Washington, D.C
Jim McLachlan (born 1943), Canadian politician
Jimmy McLachlan (1870–?), Scottish footballer

See also
James MacLachlan (1919–1943), British flying ace